The National Football League 75th Anniversary All-Time Team was chosen by a selection committee of media and league personnel in 1994 to honor the greatest players of the first 75 years of the National Football League (NFL). Five players on the list were on NFL rosters at the time of the selections: Joe Montana, Jerry Rice, Rod Woodson, Reggie White, and Ronnie Lott. Gale Sayers was named to the team as both a halfback and kickoff returner. Every player is a member of the Pro Football Hall of Fame, except for Billy "White Shoes" Johnson.

Offense
Source:

Defense
Source:

Special teams
Source:

75th Anniversary All-Two-Way Team
Source:

See also
National Football League 50th Anniversary All-Time Team
National Football League 100th Anniversary All-Time Team
National Football League All-Decade Teams

Notes

References

External links
 75th Anniversary All Time Team, from NFL.com.

75th